Gert Bjerendal (born 12 June 1955) is a Swedish archer. He competed at the 1984 Summer Olympics and the 1988 Summer Olympics.

References

1955 births
Living people
Swedish male archers
Olympic archers of Sweden
Archers at the 1984 Summer Olympics
Archers at the 1988 Summer Olympics
Sportspeople from Gothenburg
20th-century Swedish people